Del Andrews (October 5, 1894 – October 27, 1942), born Udell Endrows, was an American film director and screenwriter in the 1920s. He primarily worked on low budget westerns, writing and directing films starring Hoot Gibson, Fred Thomson, and Bob Custer.

He shared an Academy Award nomination with Maxwell Anderson for the script to Universal's 1930 film All Quiet on the Western Front.

Selected filmography
Judgment of the Storm (1924)
 His Forgotten Wife (1924)
 The Wild Bull's Lair (1925)
 Ridin' the Wind (1925)
 The Ridin' Streak (1925)
 Collegiate (1926)
 Lone Hand Saunders (1926)
 The Yellow Back (1926) - as director
 The Hero on Horseback (1927)
 The Racket (1928)
 The Rawhide Kid (1928)
 Betrayal (1929)
 All Quiet on the Western Front (1930)

References

External links 

Allmovie bio

1894 births
1942 deaths
American male screenwriters
Film directors from Missouri
20th-century American male writers
20th-century American screenwriters